Lownes is a surname. Notable people with the surname include:

Anna Lownes (1842–1910), American painter
Victor Lownes (1928–2017), American businessman and Playboy Enterprises executive

See also
Lowness (disambiguation)